The Ananda Puraskar is an award for Bengali literature awarded annually by the ABP Group to writers using Bengali, usually from West Bengal, India.

History
The award can be traced to a comment by Annada Shankar Ray ruing the absence of literary awards in Bengal. It was started on 20 April 1958 and has been given in the same month since. Initially, there were two awards, in memory of Prafulla Kumar Sarkar and Suresh Chandra Majumdar, the founders of Anandabazar Patrika. Another award was started in 1984 in memory of Ashok Kumar Sarkar to commemorate the golden jubilee of Desh. All three awards were merged in 2000.

Awardees

1958 – Bibhutibhushan Mukhopadhyay (Prafulla Kumar Sarkar Memorial)
.......Samaresh Basu (Suresh Chandra Majumdar Memorial)
1960 – Pramathanath Bishi – Kerry Saheber Munshi (novel) (Prafulla Kumar Sarkar Memorial)
1961 – Syed Mujtaba Ali
1963 - Kalidas Roy
1966 – Sukumar Sen
1967 – Bimal Kar
1968 – Gopal Chandra Bhattacharya
1970 – Gour Kishore Ghosh
1971 – Satyajit Ray, Santosh Kumar Ghosh
1972 – Sunil Gangopadhyay – for general work
1973 – Shirshendu Mukhopadhyay<ref
name="shirshendu"></ref> – Manabjomin (novel)
1974 – Moti Nandi
1975 – Shakti Chattopadhyay
1976 – Buddhadeb Guha – Halud Basanta (novel)
1978 – Nikhil Sarkar
1979 – Syed Mustafa Siraj
1980 – Probodh Kumar Sanyal
1981 – Sanjib Chattopadhyay
1982 – Samaresh Majumdar
1983 – Annada Shankar Ray
1984 – Subhas Bhattacharya – Adhunik Bangla Prayog Abhidhan (A Dictionary of Modern Bengali Usage),
.......Dibyendu Palit – Sahajoddha (novel), 
.......Sukumar Sen, Sagarmoy Ghosh, Bimal Mitra (Ashok Kumar Sarkar Memorial)<ref
name="abp"/>
1985 – Alokranjan Dasgupta
1986 – Ketaki Kushari Dyson<ref
name="virgil"></ref> – Rabindranath o Victoria Ocampor Sandhane (historical novel) (Prafulla Kumar Sarkar Memorial)
1988 – Abul Bashar
1989 – Sunil Gangopadhyay – Purbo-Paschim (novel)
.......Amitav Ghosh – The Shadow Lines (novel)
.......Nirad C. Chaudhuri – Thy Hand, Great Anarch! (autobiography)
1990 – Shirshendu Mukhopadhyay – Doorbeen (novel)
.......Jay Goswami – Ghumiechho, Jhaupata? (poetry)
1991 – Subhash Mukhopadhyay, Jaya Mitra
1992 – Taslima Nasrin – Nirbachito Column (articles)
1993 – Bangla Academy (refused) 
.......Clinton B. Seely (Ashok Kumar Sarkar memorial)
1994 – Annada Shankar Ray, 
.......Shamsur Rahman, 
.......Anisuzzaman (Ashok Kumar Sarkar Memorial),
.......Naren Biswas – Aitihyer Angikar (Audio cassettes, 13 Nos.)
1995 – Dr. Nazrul Islam – Bakul (novel)
1996 – Akhtaruzzaman Elias – Khwabnama (novel) 
1997 – Bani Basu – Maitreya Jatak (novel) (Prafulla Kumar Sarkar Memorial)
........Ketaki Kushari Dyson<ref
name="virgil"/> & Sushobhan Adhikari – Ranger Rabindranath (on Tagore's colour vision) (Suresh Chandra Majumdar Memorial)
1998 – Jay Goswami<ref
name="joy"/> – Jara Brishtite Bhijechhilo (novel in verse)
1999 – Mandakranta Sen – Hriday Abadhya Meye (poetry)
2000 – Taslima Nasrin – Amar Meyebela (memoirs)
2001 – Gauriprasad Ghosh – Everyman's Dictionary
2002 – Sudhir Chakraborty – Baul Fakir Katha (folk culture)
2003 – Tilottama Majumdar – Basudhara (novel)
2004 – Srijato – Uranto Sab Joker (poetry)
2005 – Mihir Sengupta – Bishad Briksha (autobiography)
2006 – Utpal Kumar Basu – Sukh-Duhkher Sathi (poetry)
2007 – Dhritikanta Lahiri Choudhury – Hatir Boi (on elephants)
2008 – Hasan Azizul Huq – Agunpakhi (novel)
2009 – Ranajit Guha – Kabir Naam O Sarbanaam
2010 – Sunanda Sikdar – Dayamayir Katha
2011 – Gautam Bhadra – Nyara Bot-tolaye Jai Ko-bar?
2012 – Pinaki Thakur – Chumbaner Kshata (poetry)
2013 – Ramkumar Mukhopadhyay – Dhanapatir Singhalyatra (novel)
2014 – Arindam Chakrabarti – Bhaatkaporer Bhabna Ebong Koyekti Aatpoure Darshanik Prayas (philosophy)
2015 – Swapnamoy Chakraborty – Holde Golap
2016 – Sudhir Dutta – Tabu Moi o Srestho Kobitaguccho
2017 – Anisuzzaman – Bipula Prithibi (The Vast World)
2018 – Santosh Rana – Rajniti Ek Jibon
2019 – Nalini Bera – Subarnarenu Subarnarekha

See also
Rabindra Puraskar
Bankim Puraskar
Sahitya Akademi Award to Bengali Writers
Bangla Academy Award

References

External links
Contributors to the Rabindranath Section of Parabaas, Biographical data in website of Parabaas Bookstore

Bengali-language literature
Indian literary awards
 
Bengali literary awards
ABP Group
Civil awards and decorations of West Bengal
1958 establishments in West Bengal
Awards established in 1958